Glebe Burying Ground, also known as Glebe Cemetery, is a historic cemetery located near Swoope, Augusta County, Virginia. It is one of the oldest cemeteries in Augusta County and contains a wide variety of stones illustrating the evolution of local funerary art from the 1770s through the 19th century.  The surviving stones date from 1770 to 1891.  They reflect changes in the local funerary art of Scotch-Irish, English, and German settlers and their descendants.

It was listed on the National Register of Historic Places in 1985.

References

External links
 

Buildings and structures in Augusta County, Virginia
Cemeteries on the National Register of Historic Places in Virginia
English-American culture in Virginia
Funerary art
German-American culture in Virginia
National Register of Historic Places in Augusta County, Virginia
Scotch-Irish American culture in Virginia